Rockville High School (RHS) is a four-year high school in Rockville, Maryland, United States.  The school was founded in 1968, and its current building was completed in August 2004. Rockville High School is based in Montgomery County, Maryland. In 2019, enrollment was 1,440 students. Earle B. Wood Middle School is the only feeder school for RHS.

The original building underwent renovation starting in the 2002–2003 school year, and was completed by the start of the 2004–2005 school year. During the two years of renovation, RHS students attended Northwood High School.

Academics

Rockville High School includes programs that give potential college credit to students, such as the International Baccalaureate program and Advanced Placement courses.
 
The school also offers career driven programs such as the International Baccalaureate Career-Pathway Certificate, Project Lead the Way, and Educorps, where students have the opportunity to intern in school with teachers to help other students.

Journalism

Rockville was the National Winner in the "High School Publication" category of the 2005, 2007, and 2010 Student Publishing Awards, and students were invited to meet Vice President Joe Biden in honor of their award. Rockville won the Gold Crown for high school newspapers in 2010, the Silver Crown in 2006 and 2007, the Silver Crown in online journalism in 2009 and 2010, and numerous Golden Circle awards. The Rampage in 2007 won the National Pacemaker award, and in 2006 and 2010 was a finalist in the online category. The Echoes literary magazine and the Rampage both won the 2009 American Scholastic Press Association publication awards in their respective categories.   In 2009, Rockville was the only high school in the nation to receive press passes to the inauguration of president Obama. In 2008, two students received the Courage in Journalism Award for publishing a package of stories about gangs and violence.

Clubs and extra-curricular activities
Rockville High School was the only high school in Maryland that had a pipe band. The band originated at nearby Robert E. Peary High School in 1961 and moved to RHS when Peary High closed in 1984. The Montgomery County Board of Education cut the funding for the pipe band after the 2016–17 school year.

State Championships

Fall Sports 
 Boys Cross Country (1985)
 Boys Soccer (1981, 1983, 1984, 1988, 1991, 1992, 1996)
 Girls Volleyball (1984)

Winter Sports 
 Girls Basketball (1987)
 Boys Basketball (1971, 1973)

Notable alumni
 Lane DeGregory, journalist
 Andrew Fiscella, actor
 Anne Kaiser, politician

References

External links
 Official site
 Bird's eye view of the building architecture
 Alumni site
 Earle B. Wood Middle School
 The Rampage online
 The Rockville High School Pipe Band
 Friends of Rockville Music
 RHS Theatre
 Drama Club

Public high schools in Montgomery County, Maryland
International Baccalaureate schools in Maryland
Rockville High School
Educational institutions established in 1968
1968 establishments in Maryland